William Ryan  (born 23 December 1988) is an Australian sailor and an Olympic champion in the Men's 470 class with Mathew Belcher.

Ryan represented Australia at the 2016 Summer Olympics in Rio de Janeiro, Brazil. He and teammate Mathew Belcher won the silver medal in the 470 class. Ryan and Belcher returned for the 2020 Summer Olympics in Tokyo, Japan, where they won the gold medal in the 470 class.

Ryan is a 5 time 470 world champion together with Mathew Belcher.

Ryan's sister is Jaime Ryan who competed at the Tokyo 2020 Olympics with him. She sailed in the Women’s 49er FX event.

Earlier years 
Will Ryan experienced sailing when only two days old when he watched the 1988 Sydney to Hobart race in his grandfather's boat with his family. In his early years he was inspired by his grandfather and sailed in an old Sabot (dinghy) on Lake Macquarie in NSW.

At the age of 11, Ryan competed in his first race with the Toronto Amateur Sailing Club. He then competed in the Laser Radial class at the 2006 Youth World Sailing Championships.

Together with teammate Byron White, Ryan came second at the 2008 World Championships in the 29er boat by finishing behind fellow Australians Steven Thomas and Jasper Warren, but in front of Britons Max Richardson and Alex Groves who took the bronze.

Career highlights
World Championships
2008 – Sorrento,  2nd, 29er (with Byron White) 

Olympic Games
2016 – Rio de Janeiro,  2nd, 470 (with Mathew Belcher)
2020 – Tokyo,  1st, 470 (with Mathew Belcher)

Recognition
 2013 – Australian Sailing Awards – Male Sailor of the Year (with Mathew Belcher)
 2013 – Australian Institute of Sport Awards – Team of the Year (with Mathew Belcher)
 2014 – Australian Sailing Awards – Male Sailor of the Year (with Mathew Belcher)
 2015 – Australian Sailing Awards – Male Sailor of the Year (with Mathew Belcher)
 2019 – Australian Sailing Awards – Male Sailor of the Year (with Mathew Belcher)
 2019 – Australian Institute of Sport Awards – Team of the Year (with Mathew Belcher)
2021 – Australian Sailing Awards – Male Sailor of the Year (with Mathew Belcher)
2022 – Australia Day Honours – Medal of the Order of Australia

References

External links 
 
 

Living people
29er class sailors
Sailors at the 2016 Summer Olympics – 470
Sailors at the 2020 Summer Olympics – 470
Olympic sailors of Australia
Australian male sailors (sport)
Olympic silver medalists for Australia
Olympic gold medalists for Australia
Recipients of the Medal of the Order of Australia
Olympic medalists in sailing
Medalists at the 2016 Summer Olympics
Medalists at the 2020 Summer Olympics
470 class world champions
World champions in sailing for Australia
1988 births
21st-century Australian people